The club Centro Ítalo Venezolano (usually called CIV) was a professional football club promoted to Segunda División in 2009, based in Caracas.

Achievements
Segunda División Venezolana: 1
Clausura 2009

Current first team squad

External links
Unofficial Site

Association football clubs established in 1964
CIV
Football clubs in Caracas
1964 establishments in Venezuela